The Lipovan Orthodox Old-Rite Church (or Orthodox Old-ritualist Church, Orthodox Old-Rite Church) is the Romanian Old Believer jurisdiction of the Belokrinitskaya Hierarchy.

The head of the Church carries the title of Archbishop of Belo-Krinitsa and Metropolitan of All Old Orthodox Christians. His see is officially (not in fact) in Bila Krynytsya (Bukovina), his residence in Brăila, Romania (current titular: Metropolitan Leontius (Izot) since 24 October 1996).

History

Lipovans are Russian Old Believers who fled Russia in the late 17th and early 18th centuries, in order to escape the persecution of their faith.

Eparchies 
There are seven eparchies of the Lipovan Orthodox Old-Rite Church:
 Eparchy of Fântâna Albă, with residence in Brăila, which includes the old rite orthodox parishes from Brăila and Galați counties, Bucharest, Borduşani (Ialomiţa county), Fântâna Albă/Bila Krynytsia (Ukraine);
 Eparchy of Slava, with residence in Slava Rusă (Tulcea county), which includes the parishes from Slava Rusă, Slava Cercheză, Carcaliu, Ghindăreşti, Jurilovca, 2 Mai, Constanţa, Cernavodă and Năvodari in Constanţa county, and parishes from Bulgaria;
 Eparchy of Bukovina and Moldavia, with residence in Târgu Frumos (Iași County), which includes the parishes from Iași, Vaslui, Neamţ, Suceava and Botoșani counties;
 Eparchy of Tulcea, with residence in Tulcea, which includes the parishes from Tulcea, Sulina, Mahmudia, Sarichioi, Periprava, Chilia Veche, Mila 23, Sfiştovca;
 Eparchy of the USA, residing in Oregon, which includes the parishes from the U.S., Canada, and Australia;
 Western Eparchy, based in Turin (Italy), which includes the parishes from Italy, Spain, Portugal, France, Germany, Austria, and Hungary;
 Eparchy of the Baltic States, residing in Jēkabpils, comprising the parishes from Estonia, Latvia, and Lithuania.

See also
 Lipovans

External links
 Official website

References

Eastern Orthodoxy in Romania
Old Believer movement